Jane Hawkins (1841–1904) was a British portrait painter from Chelsea who exhibited at the Royal Academy and with the Society of British Artists.

Hawkins public paintings are mostly of political individuals especially those of the family of the Earl of Derby. Hawkins produced portraits some copying the styles of Francis Grant and James Rannie Swinton.

Many of her paintings of the Smith-Stanley family of Derby are in the collection of Hughenden Manor since 1947.

References

External links
 

1904 deaths
1841 births
19th-century British painters
19th-century British women artists
20th-century British painters
20th-century British women artists
Artists from London
British portrait painters
British women painters